Reis Lee Leming GM (6 November 1930 – 5 November 2012) was an American airman who was awarded the British George Medal for his efforts in rescuing people during the North Sea flood of 1953.

The rescue
Many U.S. service families were quartered there, and Leming's unit, the 67th Air Rescue Squadron, based at nearby RAF Sculthorpe, were mobilised to assist. Leming, a 22-year-old Airman 2nd Class serving as an Aerial Gunner, could not swim, but dressed in a survival suit and dragging an inflatable raft, waded through the flood waters in the darkness and rescued 27 people before collapsing from exhaustion and hypothermia.

Leming returned to the USA the year after the flood but the people of Hunstanton never forgot him and when he announced his engagement (to Mary Ramsay) the town insisted on hosting the wedding. The ceremony was held in June 1953 and was attended by the mayor and other leading figures of the town whilst a large crowd gathered outside. At a time sugar was still rationed in England local women pooled their rations to bake Leming a huge wedding cake and the town presented him with a set of Doulton china. Since that time Leming returned to the town on several occasions, in 1993 attended the memorial service for the disaster and was presented to the Queen and Queen Mother at Sandringham.

Awards

In March 1953 Leming was awarded the Soldier's Medal by the United States, and on 15 April 1953 was presented with the George Medal. He and Staff Sergeant Freeman A. Kilpatrick, who rescued 18 people that night, were the first Americans to receive the medal in peacetime. Presenting the medal, Sir David Maxwell Fyfe, the Home Secretary, said:

The Queen, who did not present the medal personally as she was in mourning for Queen Mary at the time, thanked Leming at Sandringham House in 1993.

On 22 September 1956 Leming was invited to christen the ship Mayflower II, a replica of the Pilgrim ship, that was built at Brixham, Devon.

On 13 July 2012 Hunstanton Town Council approved a motion to name the footway through the Esplanade Gardens "Reis Leming Way".

As of November 2021, Reis Lemings George Medal and Soldiers Medal are on Display at the RAF Sculthorpe Heritage Centre.

See also
 List of recipients of the George Medal

References

External links
 
 
 

1930 births
2012 deaths
People from East St. Louis, Illinois
Recipients of the George Medal
Recipients of the Soldier's Medal
United States Air Force airmen